Salt Mango Tree is a 2015 Indian Malayalam-language comedy-drama film directed by Rajesh Mohanan, starring Biju Menon, Lakshmi Priyaa Chandramouli and Suhasini Maniratnam. The film is a remake of the 2014 Bengali film Ramdhanu  and the title is taken from the Mohanlal starrer Doore Doore Oru Koodu Koottam (1986). The film released on 6 November 2015.

Plot

It is a hearty family entertainment story of a couple running the rat race for better schools for their one and only child. The backbone of the story relies on resilience and values that a family can and provides. It critically asks bigger questions like whether right to education is anymore accessible and affordable as one wishes. Aravindan and Priya are the couple fighting with the education system to find a place for their son Ashwin. Deepika Mme, comes as a guiding hand for the family. Ultimately the family ends with a realization that happiness and love inside the family is more important than anything and it is not something to be bartered.

Cast

Biju Menon as Aravind
Lakshmi Priyaa Chandramouli as Priya Aravind
Aswin Varkachaan as Manu
Hareesh Perumanna as Shafeeque
Suhasini Maniratnam as Deepika
Saiju Kurup as Praveen
Paris Laxmi as Angela Praveen
Indrans as Pavithran
Babu Swamy as Menon 
Jayaprakash Kuloor as Appooppan
Sarayu as Meenakshi Mohan Kumar
Manju Satheesh as Treesa Chacko
Sudheer Karamana as Mohan Kumar
Elizabath as Ammoomma
Sunil Sukhada as Kumar 
Raghavan as Swami
Vijay Menon as Vice Principal
Pradeep Kottayam as Sameer
Kottayam Purushan as Biju
Saiju Panikkar as Chacko
Lakshmi Menon as Teena
Bindhu Ramakrishnan
Giri Shankar as Alwin
Binoy as Satheesan
Sreedharan Bhattdhari as Peter
Baiju Ezhupunna as Ajith
Manjith
Praveen Shankaranaryanan as Medical rep
Ramji
Umeshan
 Manjushaa-Manjusha
Noora-Sreevidhya
Jeni-Swapana
Milu-Meghana
Teacher-Parvathy Menon
Principal-Jennifer
Principal-Ambika Mohan
Doly-Riya
Lisy-Raji                  
Pushpa[servant]-Varsha Abhay
Darshan D Nair as Abhi- Meenakshi's and Mohan kumar's son

Soundtrack
"Kaathilaaro" : Sithara Krishnakumar, Lyrics : Rafeeq Ahamed, Music :Hesham Abdul Wahab
"Kaattummel Anchaaru" : Hesham Abdul Wahab, Lyrics :Aslam, Music : Hesham Abdul Wahab
"Kanavil Kanavil" : Hesham Abdul Wahab, Lyrics: Madhu Vasudevan, Music Hesham Abdul Wahab

Reception 
Critical reception was mostly positive. The Times of India gave the movie 2.5 stars, claiming its script and writing lacks a usual happy ending or something that can deftly hold it all together. However, the review stay back with film's good humour quotient.

References

External links
 

2015 films
Indian comedy films
Films scored by Hesham Abdul Wahab
Films scored by Bijibal
Malayalam remakes of Bengali films
2010s Malayalam-language films
Films directed by Rajesh Nair